The 1890–91 season is the 17th season of competitive football by Rangers.

The season saw the club play in a league set-up for the first time in its history.

Overview
Rangers played a total of 20 competitive matches during the 1890–91 season. They were the joint winners of the first ever Scottish League, sharing the title with Dumbarton. The club's drew the championship play-off 2–2, so both were awarded the title and declared champions.

The club ended the season without the Scottish Cup after being knocked out by Celtic in the first round by 1–0.

Results
All results are written with Rangers' score first.

Scottish League

Championship play-off

Scottish Cup

Appearances

See also
 1890–91 in Scottish football
 1890–91 Scottish Cup

External links
1890–91 Rangers F.C.Results

Rangers F.C. seasons
Rangers
Scottish football championship-winning seasons